Domains of Darkover is an anthology of fantasy and science fiction short stories edited by Marion Zimmer Bradley. The stories are set in Bradley's world of Darkover. The book was first published by DAW Books (No. 810) in March 1990.

Contents
 Introduction: And Contrariwise by Marion Zimmer Bradley
 "'Acurrhir Todo; Nada Perdonad" by Deborah Wheeler
 "An Object Lesson" by Mercedes R. Lackey
 "Beginnings" by Cynthia Drolet
 "Clingfire" by Patricia Duffy Novak
 "Death in Thendara" by Dorothy J. Heydt
 "Firetrap" by Elisabeth Waters and Marion Zimmer Bradley
 "Friends" by Judith K. Kobylecky
 "Manchild" by L. D. Woeltjen
 "Just a Touch...", by Lynne Armstrong-Jones
 "Mind-eater" by Joan Marie Verba
 "Mists" by Meg Mac Donald
 "Our Little Rabbit" by Mary K. Frey
 "The Gift from Ardais" by Barbara Denz
 "The Horse Race" by Diann Partridge
 "The Plague" by Janet R. Rhodes
 "The Tapestry" by Micole Sudberg
 "To Serve Kihar" by Judith Sampson

Sources
 
 
 
 

Darkover books
1990 anthologies
American anthologies
Fantasy anthologies
Works by Marion Zimmer Bradley
DAW Books books